Kramers Ergot is a series of anthology-style books of comic art edited by Sammy Harkham.

Publication history
Kramers Ergot started as a mini-comic self-published by Sammy Harkham under the imprint Avodah Books. Issues 4 and 5 were published by Gingko Press, while issues 6 and 7 were published by Buenaventura Press.

Published in November 2008, Kramers Ergot 7 features almost 60 artists and is larger (16" by 21") and more expensive ($125) than previous editions.<ref>[http://www.comicbookresources.com/?page=article&id=18404 "Kramers Ergot 7 Anthology Debuts at SPX], Comic Book Resources, October 10, 2008.</ref>

An eighth volume was released in January 2012 from PictureBox.

A ninth volume was released in April 2016 from Fantagraphics Books.

A tenth volume was released in July 2019 from Fantagraphics Books.

Reception
A Quimby's blog item promoting multiple touring artists said: "Kramers Ergot has been favorably reviewed and placed on numerous "best of the year" lists, including L.A. Weekly, Dazed & Confused, the Comics Journal, and Publishers Weekly''."

Issues and contributors

Notes

External links
 Ford, Andrew. Review of Kramers Ergot 4.
 Kramers Ergot 6 at Buenaventura Press
 Review of Kramers Ergot 5, Time
 Review of Kramers Ergot 6, The Comics Journal

Comics publications
Comics anthologies